Jarnac (Saintongese: Jharnat) is a commune in the Charente department, southwestern France.

It was the site of the Battle of Jarnac in 1569.

It is the birthplace and resting place of François Mitterrand, President of France from 1981 to 1995.

Geography
Jarnac is situated on the right (north) bank of the river Charente between Angoulême and Cognac. It is about 20 km west of Angoulême, and about 10 km east of Cognac.

Population

Personalities
Jarnac is the birthplace of former French president François Mitterrand (26 October 1916 – 8 January 1996) and the place where he is buried.

Gastronomy
The region has long been associated with the production of cognac. The town is host to numerous smaller cognac producers as well as larger internationally known brands such as Courvoisier, Delamain and Thomas Hine & Co.

International relations
Jarnac is paired with:
 Dalkeith, Scotland
 Lautertal (Odenwald), Germany
 Donnacona, Quebec, Canada
 Dogliani, Italy

See also
Communes of the Charente department

References

Gallery

External links

 Jarnac in the regional press
 Tourism in Jarnac
 Local organizations
 Movie theaters

Communes of Charente
Angoumois
Charente communes articles needing translation from French Wikipedia